The orange-spotted emerald (Oxygastra curtisii) is a dragonfly in the family Corduliidae. It is the only species in its genus.

It has bright green eyes and a bronzy-green body with yellow spots along the top of the abdomen. The last segment of the abdomen (S10) has a prominent yellow mark on the upper surface.

The species occurs in much of Europe but is regionally extinct in the Netherlands and the United Kingdom. Its habitat is slow flowing streams, pools and ponds.

Status in Britain
This species was only ever known from two areas in southern England, one around the River Stour and Moors River in east Dorset, where the species was recorded from 1820 to 1963, and the other on the River Tamar in Devon where the species was recorded in 1946 only. It went extinct due to sewage pollution in rivers.

Habitat

This species lives in fresh water streams and rivers, with muddy or sandy beds. Where it lives today, it is still continually threatened by poor water quality. The nymphs are found on the banks of rivers, where they hide amongst leaf litter. Despite being regionally extinct in the UK and the Netherlands, they are still widespread throughout Europe,

References

4. Wildlife and countryside. https://www.wcl.org.uk/wanted-the-orange-spotted-emerald-stolen-from-future-generations.asp. Retrieved 5 January 2021.

Dragonflies of Europe
Corduliidae